Kamiel Reynders (born 22 February 1931) is a Belgian former swimmer. He competed in the men's 4 × 200 metre freestyle relay at the 1952 Summer Olympics.

References

External links
 

1931 births
Possibly living people
Olympic swimmers of Belgium
Swimmers at the 1952 Summer Olympics
Swimmers from Antwerp
Belgian male freestyle swimmers